Zontar, the Thing from Venus (also known as Zontar: The Invader from Venus) is a 1967 American made-for-television horror science fiction film directed by Larry Buchanan and starring John Agar and Susan Bjurman. It is based on the teleplay by Hillman Taylor and Buchanan. It is a low-budget 16 mm color remake of Roger Corman's It Conquered the World (1956), which also featured an alien invader from Venus.

Plot

At a dinner party with their wives, NASA scientist Dr. Keith Ritchie (Anthony Huston) reveals to his colleague Dr. Curt Taylor (John Agar) that he has secretly been in communication with an alien from Venus named Zontar who he claims is coming to Earth to solve all of the world's problems.  However, as soon as Zontar arrives on Earth via a fallen laser satellite it quickly becomes obvious that the  three-eyed, bat-winged, skeletal black creature has a hidden agenda, as it begins causing local power outages that stop telephones, automobiles and even running water from working, and it starts taking control of people's minds using flying lobster-like "injecto-pods" that sprout from its wings. Only after his wife is killed does Ritchie finally realize that Zontar has come not as a savior but as a conqueror, and he goes to confront the hideous alien in the sulfur spring-heated cave that it has made its secret base.

Cast
 John Agar as Dr. Curt Taylor
 Susan Bjurman as Ann Taylor
 Anthony Huston as Keith Ritchie
 Patricia De Laney as Martha Ritchie
 Neil Fletcher as Gen. Matt Young
 Warren Hammack as John
 Colleen Carr as Louise
 Jeff Alexander as Rocket Scientist
 Bill Thurman as Police Chief Brad Crenshaw
 Andrew Traister as Sgt. Magalari
 Jonathan Ledford as Gate Guard
 George Edglley as Mr. Ledford
 Carol Gilley as Alice
 Bertha Holmes as Townswoman

Reception
In a review for AllMovie, Paul Gaita wrote "For experienced cult movie watchers, Zontar is the cinematic equivalent of a car accident, an unpleasant spectacle from which one cannot look away". Chris Eggerston of Bloody Disgusting criticized the alien in the film for resembling "a human-sized shit-monster with wings", but felt that it looked better than the alien from It Conquered the World.

Zontar, the Thing from Venus is arguably Buchanan's best known film.

From 1981–1992 Zontar, the Magazine from Venus was published in Boston. It included an interview with Buchanan by Rev. Ivan Stang.

Creature Feature gave the movie one star, stating it was so inept that only fans of so bad it's good films would enjoy it.

TV Guide states that while the movie is not good, it is not as bad as its reputation suggests.

In popular culture
Zontar was famously spoofed by SCTV in the Season 4, Cycle 2, Episode 3 sequence "Zontar", originally broadcast October 30, 1981.

See also
List of American films of 1967
List of films featuring extraterrestrials

References

External links
 
 

1966 films
1960s English-language films
American science fiction television films
Venus in film
Remakes of American films
American science fiction horror films
Horror film remakes
American International Pictures films
1960s science fiction horror films
American horror television films
Films directed by Larry Buchanan
Articles containing video clips
1960s American films